Saint-Roch-de-Mékinac is a parish municipality in the Mékinac Regional County Municipality, in administrative region of Mauricie, in the province of Quebec in Canada.

Geography

Municipal territory covers both side of Saint-Maurice River, including a small portion of La Mauricie National Park. The village of Saint-Roch-de-Mékinac is located at the top of a hill on Eastern side of Saint-Maurice River.

Toponymy

The Saint-Roch parish was named in honour of Roch of Montpellier. The term Mékinac is associated with several homonyms of place names in the sector: Mékinac River, Saint-Joseph-de-Mékinac and Mékinac Lake.

Demographics 

 
Mother tongue:
 English as first language: 0%
 French as first language: 98.4%
 English and French as first language: 0%
 Other as first language: 0%

See also 

 Lake Roberge (Grandes-Piles)
 Matawin River

References

External links

Parish municipalities in Quebec
Incorporated places in Mauricie
Mékinac Regional County Municipality